Porte de Hal or Hallepoort (Dutch) is a rapid transit station in Brussels, Belgium, consisting of both a metro station (on the southern segment of lines 2 and 6) and a premetro (underground tram) station (serving lines 3 and 4 on the North–South Axis between Brussels-North railway station and Albert premetro station). The metro station opened on 2 October 1988 and the premetro station opened on 3 December 1993 (the metro operates one level below the premetro lines).

The station is located in the municipality of Saint-Gilles, south of the City of Brussels, under the Small Ring (Brussels' inner ring road) and next to the 14th-century Halle Gate, after which it is named. It is one metro stop away or about ten minutes' walk from Brussels-South railway station.

The station contains several artworks by François Schuiten of metro trains and futuristic cityscapes, including some views of the medieval Halle Gate amongst skyscrapers.

External links

Brussels metro stations
Railway stations opened in 1988
Saint-Gilles, Belgium